|}

The Munster Oaks is a Group 3 flat horse race in Ireland open to thoroughbred fillies and mares aged three years or older. It is run at Cork over a distance of 1 mile and 4 furlongs (2,414 metres), and it is scheduled to take place each year in June.

History
The race was established in 2003 at Naas and was titled the Noblesse Stakes after Noblesse, a successful Irish-trained filly whose victories included The Oaks in 1963. It was originally classed at Listed level, and the first running was restricted to three-year-olds.

The Noblesse Stakes was promoted to Group 3 status and opened to older fillies and mares in 2004. It was transferred to Cork in 2005 and renamed the Munster Oaks in 2014. The title Noblesse Stakes is now given to a similar race run at Cork in April.

Records
Most successful horse (2 wins):
 Grace O'Malley – 2009, 2010

Leading jockey (3 wins):
 Kevin Manning – Snippets (2003), Danelissima (2004), Banimpire (2011)
 Pat Smullen – Grace O'Malley (2009, 2010), Sapphire (2012)

Leading trainer (6 wins):

 Aidan O'Brien - Ice Queen (2008), Venus De Milo (2014), Words (2015), Pretty Perfect (2016), Flattering (2018), Snow (2020)

Winners

See also
 Horse racing in Ireland
 List of Irish flat horse races

References
 Racing Post:
 galopp-sieger.de – Noblesse Stakes.
 ifhaonline.org – International Federation of Horseracing Authorities – Munster Oaks Stakes (2019).
 pedigreequery.com – Noblesse Stakes.

Flat races in Ireland
Long-distance horse races for fillies and mares
Recurring sporting events established in 2003
Cork Racecourse
2003 establishments in Ireland